In the Round is an album by Pentangle, jointly produced by Doug Beveridge, Roger Wake, and Pentangle. It was issued in 1986 on Spindrift SPIN 120 in 1986 and on Varrick CDVR026 (CD) VR026 (LP) and CVR026 (cassette) in 1990. There is a typo on the sleeve, as it credits the licence to "Jackie" McShee, not Jacqui McShee. There is also a widespread use of the name "Vanick", a mistake for "Varrick". It was reissued in 1988 on Plane CD88505. It was reissued in 2006 on Talking Elephant.
Nigel Portman Smith replaced original bassist Danny Thompson.

Track listing

"Play the Game" (Jacqui McShee, Nigel Portman Smith)
"The Open Sea" (Bert Jansch)
"She Moved Through the Fair" (Traditional; arranged by Pentangle)
"Set Me Free (When the Night Is Over)" (Terry Cox)
"Come to Me Baby" (Jansch, Portman Smith)
"Sunday Morning Blues" (McShee, Mike Piggott, Jansch)
"Chase That Devil Away" (Cox)
"The Saturday Movie" (Jansch)
"Süil Agrar" (Traditional; arranged by Pentangle)
"Circle the Moon" (Jansch, Portman Smith)
"Let Me Be" (Jansch)

Personnel
Pentangle
Mike Piggott - violin, acoustic and electric guitars
Nigel Portman Smith - bass, keyboards, piano, vocals
Bert Jansch - acoustic guitar, banjo, vocals
Terry Cox - drums, DX-7, percussion, vocals
Jacqui McShee - vocals
Pam McShee - lead vocals on "Süil Agrar", backing vocals on "Play the Game"

References

1986 albums
Pentangle (band) albums